Sergiu Brujan (born 14 March 1976) is a Romanian former football player who played as a right back or right midfielder.

External links
 
 

1976 births
Living people
Romanian footballers
Association football defenders
Association football midfielders
Liga I players
Liga II players
FC Brașov (1936) players
CSM Ceahlăul Piatra Neamț players
FC Rapid București players
ASC Oțelul Galați players
FC Astra Giurgiu players
Sepsi OSK Sfântu Gheorghe players
People from Prejmer